Angustibacter speluncae is a Gram-positive, strictly aerobic and motile bacterium from the genus of Angustibacter which has been isolated from a stalactite from the Yongcheon Cave in Korea.

References

External links
Type strain of Angustibacter speluncae at BacDive -  the Bacterial Diversity Metadatabase

Bacteria described in 2017
Actinomycetia